Davit Dighmelashvili  (born 18 January 1980) is a retired Georgian football defender.

External links
  Player profile at Dinamo's official web-site

1980 births
Living people
Footballers from Georgia (country)
Expatriate footballers from Georgia (country)
Expatriate footballers in Italy
Expatriate footballers in Israel
Association football midfielders
Erovnuli Liga players
Serie B players
FC Dinamo Tbilisi players
Hapoel Ra'anana A.F.C. players
A.C.N. Siena 1904 players
FC Torpedo Kutaisi players
FC Sasco players
FC WIT Georgia players